Bronson Township is one of the nineteen townships of Huron County, Ohio, United States. As of the 2010 census the population of the township was 1,973, up from 1,780 at the 2000 census.

Geography
Located in the center of the county, it borders the following townships:
Norwalk Township – north
Hartland Township – northeast corner
Fitchville Township – east
Greenwich Township – southeast corner
Ripley Township – south
New Haven Township – southwest corner
Greenfield Township – west
Peru Township – northwest corner

No municipalities are located in Bronson Township.

Name and history
Bronson Township was named for Isaac Bronson, one of the first landowners there.

It is the only Bronson Township statewide.

Government
The township is governed by a three-member board of trustees, who are elected in November of odd-numbered years to a four-year term beginning on the following January 1. Two are elected in the year after the presidential election and one is elected in the year before it. There is also an elected township fiscal officer, who serves a four-year term beginning on April 1 of the year after the election, which is held in November of the year before the presidential election. Vacancies in the fiscal officership or on the board of trustees are filled by the remaining trustees.

References

External links
County website

Townships in Huron County, Ohio
Townships in Ohio